The 2020 Colorado Democratic presidential primary took place on March 3, 2020, as one of 15 contests scheduled on Super Tuesday in the Democratic Party primaries for the 2020 presidential election, following the South Carolina primary the weekend before. The Colorado primary, the first in the state since 2000, was a semi-closed primary and awarded 79 delegates towards the 2020 Democratic National Convention, of which 67 were pledged delegates allocated on the basis of the results of the primary.

Senator Bernie Sanders won the primary with 37% of the vote and ultimately received 29 delegates, ahead of former vice president Joe Biden, who won roughly 25% and received 21 delegates. Although former mayor Michael Bloomberg and senator Elizabeth Warren both surpassed the 15% threshold, following their withdrawal from the race in the next two days, the Colorado Democratic Party decided to directly calculate the delegate count without statewide delegates for Bloomberg and Warren, differing from the usual process in most states, where statewide delegates are calculated regularly and later reallocated to remaining candidates. Otherwise Bloomberg and Warren would have won 14 and 12 delegates instead of 9 and 8 delegates, while Sanders and Biden would have had only 24 and 17 delegates.

Sanders also benefited from that procedure after withdrawing in April: while his and Biden's campaign had agreed on Sanders keeping the statewide delegates he had won, the additional 5 statewide delegates he gained through Bloomberg's and Warren's withdrawal would all have been allocated to Biden as the presumptive nominee in accordance with the typical procedure and would have put Biden in front of Sanders with 26 to 24 delegates. Some media estimates, which did not notice the special approach of Colorado Democrats, reported these numbers as the final result.

Procedure
Colorado was one of 14 states and one territory holding primaries on March 3, 2020, also known as "Super Tuesday", following the decision of governor Jared Polis to schedule the primary on that date on April 30, 2019. Instead of party-run caucuses Colorado used a state-run primary in 2020 after voters had passed Proposition 107 in 2016, restoring presidential primaries in the state, which had been held from 1992 to 2000 but were abolished in 2000 due to financial reasons, and matching a national trend for primaries.

Voting took place throughout the state until 7:00 p.m. In the semi-closed primary, candidates had to meet a threshold of 15 percent at the congressional district or statewide level in order to be considered viable. The 67 pledged delegates to the 2020 Democratic National Convention were allocated proportionally on the basis of the results of the primary. Of these, between 4 and 9 were allocated to each of the state's 7 congressional districts and another 9 were allocated to party leaders and elected officials (PLEO delegates), in addition to 14 at-large delegates. The Super Tuesday primary as part of Stage I on the primary timetable received no bonus delegates, in order to disperse the primaries between more different date clusters and keep too many states from hoarding on the first shared date or on a March date in general.

Precinct caucuses were held on March 7, 2020, to elect delegates to county conventions, followed by county conventions until April 1, 2020, to designate delegates for the district conventions and the state convention. The district conventions had to convene until April 17, 2020, to choose the district delegates for the national convention. On April 18, 2020, the state convention voted on the 14 at-large and 9 pledged PLEO delegates for the Democratic National Convention. The delegation also included 12 unpledged PLEO delegates: 5 members of the Democratic National Committee, 5 members of Congress (including senator and former candidate Michael Bennet and 4 representatives), the governor Jared Polis, and former DNC chair Roy Romer.

Candidates
The following candidates were listed by the Colorado Secretary of State's office as certified on the ballot. Candidates that had filed a formal withdrawal with the office remained on the ballot but were not counted and did not appear in the results.

Running
 
Joe Biden
Michael Bloomberg 
Roque "Rocky" De La Fuente III
Tulsi Gabbard
Rita Krichevsky
Bernie Sanders
Elizabeth Warren
Robby Wells

Withdrawn
 
Cory Booker
Deval Patrick
Tom Steyer
Marianne Williamson
Andrew Yang

Formal withdrawal (ineligible)
 
Michael Bennet
Pete Buttigieg
John Delaney
Amy Klobuchar

Polling

Results

The results were certified on March 30. The race was called for Bernie Sanders who won a plurality of votes and delegates.

Results by county

Notes

References

External links
The Green Papers delegate allocation summary
Colorado Democratic Party delegate selection plan 

Colorado Democratic
Democratic primary
2020